Forest Springs is a community in Boulder Creek, California.

External links
 Official web site

Populated places in Santa Cruz County, California